Asarum crispulatum is a species of plant in the family Aristolochiaceae. It is endemic to China.

References

crispulatum
Flora of China
Vulnerable plants
Taxonomy articles created by Polbot